Jacquie Armstrong (born March 19, 1976) is a Canadian curler from Vancouver, British Columbia, Canada. She previously played lead for the Kelly Scott rink.

Armstrong joined the rink in 2009, replacing Renee Simons. Prior to 2009, Armstrong played second for Jody Maskiewich. In total, Armstrong has played in seven provincial championships (2000, 2001, 2002, 2008, 2009, 2010 and 2011) including two where she won with the Scott rink (2010 and 2011). At the 2010 Scotties Tournament of Hearts, the team finished in 4th place. At the 2003 Scott Tournament of Hearts she was an alternate for the Toni Fister B.C. rink, but did not play any games.

In 2009 as a member of the Scott rink, Armstrong won her lone Grand Slam of Curling event when they won the 2009 Manitoba Lotteries Women's Curling Classic.

Outside of curling, she is a software development manager.

External links
 
 Jacquie Armstrong gets the nod for Team Kelly Scott - Calgary Herald
 Kelly Scott finds a new lead

1976 births
Canadian women curlers
Living people
Sportspeople from Penticton
Curlers from Vancouver
Canada Cup (curling) participants
21st-century Canadian women